Samuilovo may refer to the following places in Bulgaria:

 Samuilovo, Blagoevgrad Province
 Samuilovo, Dobrich Province